Gwendolen Avril Coleridge-Taylor (8 March 190321 December 1998) was an English pianist, conductor, and composer. She was the daughter of composer Samuel Coleridge-Taylor and his wife Jessie (née Walmisley).

Personal life
She was born in South Norwood, London, the daughter of composer Samuel Coleridge-Taylor and his wife Jessie Walmisley, who had met as students at the Royal College of Music. She had an older brother, Hiawatha.

On 19 April 1924 Coleridge-Taylor married Harold Dashwood, in the Croydon parish church. She initially composed and conducted using her first name and maiden surname. After their divorce she dropped her first name, thereafter going as Avril Coleridge-Taylor professionally.

Coleridge-Taylor was invited on a tour of South Africa in 1952, during the period of apartheid, 
arriving on the inaugural flight of the Comet jet from Croydon to Johannesburg. Originally she was supportive of, or neutral to racial segregation; she was taken as white as she was at least three-quarters white in ancestry. When the South African government learned that she was one-quarter black (her paternal grandfather being a Creole from Sierra Leone), it would not allow her to work as a composer or conductor.

In 1939, she moved to Buxted in East Sussex, where she had views over the South Downs. Coleridge-Taylor died in Seaford on the Sussex coast in late 1998. In 1998 a blue plaque was placed at the nursing home where she spent her last days, Stone's House, Crouch Lane, Seaford.

Career in music
Coleridge-Taylor wrote her first composition, "Goodbye Butterfly", at the age of 12. Later, she won a scholarship for composition and piano at Trinity College of Music in 1915, where she was taught orchestration and composition by Gordon Jacob and Alec Rowley, and conducting by Henry Wood, Ernest Read and Albert Coates.

In 1933, she made her formal debut as a conductor at the Royal Albert Hall. She was the first female conductor of H.M.S. Royal Marines and a frequent guest conductor of the BBC Orchestra and the London Symphony Orchestra. In 1938, she was the first female conductor to conduct at the bandstand in London's Hyde Park. She was the founder and conductor of both the Coleridge-Taylor Symphony Orchestra and its accompanying musical society in 1941, intended to give employment to musicians during the depression. The orchestra at its peak consisted of more than 100 musicians made up of 70 professionals and 30 "specially selected" amateur string players, and a choir of 70 voices. She also founded the Malcolm Sargent Symphony Orchestra and the New World Singers.

In 1956, Coleridge-Taylor arranged and conducted the spirituals performed in a BBC radio version of Marc Connelly's 1930 play The Green Pastures. In 1957, she wrote her Ceremonial March for Ghana's independence day celebrations, also attended by Martin Luther King.

In later life she wrote a biography of her composer father, The Heritage of Samuel Coleridge-Taylor (London: Dobson, 1979). The book details her own life and memories of her father. She also published compositions under the pseudonym Peter Riley.

Music
Her compositions include large-scale orchestral works, as well as songs, keyboard, and chamber music. Her first orchestral work, To April (1929), also marked her first appearance as a conductor when it was performed two years later. There followed the suite Spring Magic (1933), the 12 minute tone poem Sussex Landscape, Op. 27 (1936), a Piano Concerto in F minor (1938), From the Hills,  In Memoriam R.A.F., and the Golden Wedding Ballet Suite. Wyndore (Windover) and The Elfin Artist, are both for choir and orchestra. Historical Episode (1941), one of her largest works, is a symphonic impression of war-time events and experiences.

There are signs of a revival in interest in her work in the 21st century. The manuscript of the Impromptu in A minor, Romance de pan, first performed in 1922, was rediscovered in the Royal College of Music Library collection and performed in Brighton in 2018. Sussex Landscape was played in 2019 by the Chineke! Orchestra at a Queen Elizabeth Hall concert on 22 April 2019, with a repeat at the Royal Festival Hall in October 2020. It has since been recorded. Wyndore, composed in Alfriston in 1936 and inspired by an Aldous Huxley poem ("I have tuned my music to the trees"), is a seven-minute song without words. The first performance was organised by the Birkenhead Philharmonic Society on 16 February 1937, conducted by Coleridge-Taylor. The Royal Philharmonic Concert Orchestra gave its first UK performance for 82 years on 7 March 2020 at Boxgrove Priory, West Sussex.

Works

Chamber music
Rêverie for cello and piano, Op. 26
Idylle for flute and piano, Op. 21
Impromptu for flute and piano, Op. 33
A Lament for flute and piano, Op. 31
Crépuscule d’une nuit d’éte for flute and piano
Romance for violin and piano, Op. 176
Fantasie pastorale for flute and piano*Fantasie for violin and piano
Warum? for koto and piano

Keyboard music
Interlude
To H.C.D.
Valse
Caprice
Liebeslied
Sérènade Romantique Op. 20
Danse Extatique Op. 24
Elégie Op. 25
Un Sonnet d'Amour
Four Characteristic Waltzes
Impromptu, Op. 9
Rhapsody for piano, Op. 174
Two Short Pieces for Piano: 'Allegro' and 'Lento'''Just as the Tide was Flowing: Berceuse & NocturneConcert ÉtudePastoraleMusic for the Red Cross for organAll Lovely ThingsMéditationsThe Weeping FlowerThe Garden PoolEvening SongWedding March (from The Golden Wedding)Threnody for "Brown" (Ada Riddell)NocturneTraümereiThe Snow Goose SuiteOrchestral musicSpring Magic: Fairy Ballet Suite (1920)To April, poem for orchestra (1933)Wyndore for choir and orchestra (1936)
Piano Concerto in F minor (1938)Sussex Landscape, (1940) Op. 27Suite for String Orchestra Historical Episode (1941)
 Symphonic Impression (1942)
 In Memoriam: To the RAF (1945)
 The Peace-Pipe (1949)Golden Wedding Ballet Suite
 Comet Prelude (1952)Ceremonial March to celebrate Ghana's Independence (1957)The Weeping Flower (1964)In Memoriam (1967)Snow Goose SuiteThe Dreaming Water-Lily for voice and orchestraThe Sea for voice and orchestra

Songs
 "Goodbye Butterfly", Op. 1
 "Mister Sun", Op. 2
 "Silver Stars", Op. 3
 "Who Knows?", Op. 4
 "April", Op. 5
 "The Dreaming Water Lily", Op. 6
 "The Rustling of Grass", Op. 7 (text: Alfred Noyes)
 "The Entranced Hour", Op. 8
 "Song", Op. 29
 "Nightfall", Op. 43
 "Apple Blossom", Op. 44
 "Sleeping and Waking", Op. 45

References

Sources
Cohen, Aaron, International Encyclopedia of Women Composers, New York: Hamish Books & Music, 1981.
Hixon, Donald, Women in Music: An Encyclopedic Biobibliography, Metuchen, NJ: Scarecrow P, 1993.
Sadie, Julie Ann, & Samuel, Rhian, The Norton/Grove Dictionary of Women Composers, New York: Macmillan, 1995.
Sadie, Stanley, The New Grove Dictionary of Music and Musicians, New York: Macmillan, 2001.

Further reading
Coleridge-Taylor, Avril (1979), The Heritage of Samuel Coleridge-Taylor. London: Dobson P.
Bourne, Stephen (2019), Black Poppies: Britain's Black Community and the Great War. Gloucester: The History Press.

External links
 Performance of Sussex Landscape Op. 27, by the Chineke! Orchestra, October 2020.
www.blackmahler.com for Coleridge-Taylor and the most recent book about him. His daughter Avril is also featured in the book: Elford, Charles, Black Mahler: The Samuel Coleridge-Taylor Story, London, England: Grosvenor House Publishing Ltd, 2008. 
"Daughter of Famous Composer Gives OK to S. African Bias", Jet Magazine'', 1 December 1955.
 Two songs (Can Sorrow Find Me? and Silver Stars) performed by Gabriella Di Laccio and Clelia Iruzun

1903 births
1998 deaths
20th-century classical composers
20th-century classical pianists
20th-century conductors (music)
20th-century English composers
20th-century English women musicians
20th-century women composers
Alumni of Trinity College of Music
Black British classical musicians
Black classical composers
British people of Sierra Leone Creole descent
British women classical composers
English classical composers
English classical pianists
English people of African-American descent
English Romantic composers
English women pianists
People from Buxted
People from Seaford, East Sussex
People from South Norwood
Sierra Leone Creole people
Women conductors (music)
20th-century women pianists